Millions is a 2004 British comedy-drama film directed by Danny Boyle, and starring Alex Etel, Lewis Owen McGibbon, and James Nesbitt. The film's screenwriter Frank Cottrell-Boyce adapted his novel while the film was in the process of being made. The novel was subsequently awarded the Carnegie Medal.

Plot
The story of Damian, a 9-year-old Catholic school boy, whose family moves to the suburbs of Widnes after the death of his mother. Soon after the move, Damian whilst playing in a cardboard box by the train tracks, is disturbed by a bag of money flung from a passing train. Damian immediately shows the money to his brother, 12-year-old Anthony, and the two begin thinking of what to do with it. Anthony wants the money all to himself, but Damian, kind-hearted, religious, and inspired by a lecture at school, looks for ways to give his share of the money to the poor.

Throughout the story, Damian commits small acts of kindness, such as buying birds from pet stores and setting them free, and taking beggars to Pizza Hut. On the other hand, Anthony bribes other kids at school into being his transport and bodyguards, and looks into investing the money in real estate. A mysterious man comes snooping around the train tracks, and asks Damian if he has any money. Damian thinks that the man is a beggar and tells him he has "loads of money". However, a suspicious Anthony gives the man a jar full of coins to cover Damian's tracks.

The story takes place in the weeks leading up to The Bank of England and the United Kingdom's fictionalized change from the pound (£) to the euro (€), an event publicized as "€ Day". An assembly is held at Damian's school to inform the children about the change, as well as to educate them about helping the poor. Realizing that the money, which is in pounds, will be no good after a few days, Damian decides that it would be best to give it away before the conversion. He drops £1,000 into the donation can at the assembly. The woman collecting the money, Dorothy, reports Damian to the principal. Anthony lies that he and Damian stole the money from missionaries. Damian and Anthony are grounded that night. When their father collects them from school he chats with Dorothy, and there is an obvious attraction between them.

After the donation, Anthony's friend informs them that a train carrying banknotes, which were to be destroyed after the conversion, had been robbed. One bag was stolen in a diversion, the robbers then distracted the police before escaping into a crowd of football fans. However, a robber remained on the train disguised as one of the emergency staff, and the money had been dispersed by throwing it off of the train at various locations throughout the country, to be collected by other robbers. The boys logically conclude that their money was stolen, and Damian, who thought the money was from God, feels terrible.

The mysterious man on the train tracks is one of the robbers looking for the bag. He eventually finds out where Damian lives and ransacks the house. Damian had informed his father about the money just before they came home to their destroyed house. The robber who came sneaking around hid in Damian's room after ransacking it, much in the way the original robbery was carried out. Damian's father, who had resolved to give the money back, decided that if the robbers were going to steal his family's Christmas, then he would steal the robbers' money. The family, as well as Dorothy, go on a massive shopping spree on Christmas Eve.

That night, after they are asleep, their house is bombarded by beggars and charities begging for contributions and, seeing the confusion that ensues, Damian runs off to the train tracks to burn the money, deciding that it was doing more harm than good. Meanwhile, the robber sneaks through the backdoor and is arrested by the police. While Damian was burning the money, he is visited by his dead mother, who tells him not to worry about her.

In the final scene, the audience sees Damian's dream of the family flying a rocket ship to Africa and helping develop water wells, while Damian narrates over the scene that each family member but him had hidden a little bit of the money beforehand. Damian convinced them to spend this money on the wells he is dreaming about. Earlier in the movie that was shown to be the cheapest way to drastically improve the quality of life for many African communities.

Cast

Production
In a 2014 interview, Boyle stated that, had he and Cottrell-Boyce been more confident, they would have made the film as a musical, with the characters singing and dancing. Boyle was interested in having Noel Gallagher write original songs for the film.

Release

Home media 
Millions was released on DVD on 1 November 2005. The film is also available on Disney+ after its launch on 12 November 2019.

Box office
The film was a modest box office success, earning £7,830,074.88 worldwide despite a limited release to just 340 theatres, contending with Steven Spielberg's War of the Worlds. Around £3,987,642.22 of the final box office was received in the UK alone.

Critical reception
Millions received very positive reviews, earning an 88% "Certified Fresh" approval rating on the review aggregate website Rotten Tomatoes based on 161 reviews, with an average rating of 7.40/10. The critical consensus calls the film "a charming children fable even adults can enjoy." On Metacritic, the film holds a score of 74 out of 100 based on reviews from 33 critics, indicating "generally favourable reviews".

Roger Ebert awarded it a rating of four out of four stars and declared it "one of the best films of the year."  He went on to write, ". . . although Millions uses special effects and materializing saints, it's a film about real ideas, real issues and real kids. It's not sanitized brainless eye candy. Like all great family movies, it plays equally well for adults—maybe better, since we know how unusual it is." It was on his Top 10 movies of 2005 placing at number 10.

Richard Roeper, Roger Ebert's co-host on the television show Ebert & Roeper, called it "One of the most stylish and eccentric films about childhood dreams and heartbreaks that I've ever seen."

Leonard Maltin praised the film upon its DVD release, saying "Millions is a winning and unpredictable fable from England that will charm viewers both young and old."

Christian film critics
Christian publications weighed in on the film, many adding stock to its religious message.

Catholic News Services Harry Forbes wrote, "Boyle's offbeat tale — with a clever script by Frank-Cottrell Boyce — features good performances all around, especially by the remarkable Etel, who displays just the right innocence and religious fervor in delightful vignettes with the saints. The script dramatizes the themes of money and its complexities and the need for societal philanthropy without being heavy-handed, making this ideal entertainment for older adolescents and up."

Sister Rose Pacatte, F.S.P. (AmericanCatholic.org) commented, "Millions engages, inspires and is just quirky enough to be charming."  She added, "Damien's familiarity with the saints and his recitation of their biographies is accurate and very funny."

Although praising the film overall for its positive depiction of the role the Christian faith can play in a young boy's life, some publications have pointed out the inclusion of details that viewers may find objectionable or deem inappropriate for younger audiences. As Harry Forbes wrote, "The film contains a couple of mildly crude expressions, some intense episodes of menace, a momentary sexual situation, religious stereotyping, and a brief scene where the brothers look, with boyish curiosity, at a web site for women's bras on a computer."  As such, he explained, "the USCCB Office for Film & Broadcasting classification is A-II – adults and adolescents."

Johnathan Wooten of Christian Spotlight on Entertainment downplayed the significance, saying, "Those concerned about objectionable content will not find much to offend here though. There is very little violence (a short robbery scene, a very brief moment of a child in peril). Sexual content includes a glimpse of an unmarried couple in bed together as well as pre-pubescent boy viewing an Internet lingerie ad. When played out the latter scene actually has a strange wholesomeness to it considering his other viewing options. The only profanity is some mild British slang."

Accolades
The film premiered at the 2004 Toronto International Film Festival on 14 September 2004.

2005 British Independent Film Awards
Won, Best Screenplay: Frank Cottrell-Boyce
Nominated, Most Promising Newcomer: Alex Etel

2006 Broadcast Film Critics Association Awards
Nominated, Best Young Actor: Alex Etel

2005 Emden International Film Festival
Nominated, Emden Film Award: Danny Boyle

2005 Golden Trailer Awards
Nominated, Best Animation/Family
Nominated, Best Foreign Independent Film

2005 Humanitas Prize
Nominated, Best Film

2005 Phoenix Film Critics Association
Won, Best Live Action Family Film

2006 Saturn Awards
Nominated, Best Performance by a Younger Actor: Alex Etel

Soundtrack
 The song playing in the flashback to the train robbery is "Hysteria" by Muse and, shortly after, another Muse song is played, "Blackout". It also includes "Hitsville UK" by The Clash, from their album Sandinista!.
 The song playing in the scene after they descend from the sky and provide water in Africa is "Nirvana", by Elbosco on the Angelis album.
 The song "La Petite Fille de la mer" by Vangelis also appears in the film.
 Members of the Northwest Boychoir directed by Joseph Crnko sang on the soundtrack.

References

External links

2004 films
2004 independent films
2000s Christmas comedy-drama films
2000s crime comedy-drama films
BBC Film films
British children's comedy films
British Christmas comedy-drama films
British crime comedy-drama films
Children's comedy-drama films
Films about the European Union
Films scored by John Murphy (composer)
Films about children
Films based on British novels
Films based on children's books
Films directed by Danny Boyle
Films produced by Graham Broadbent
Films set in Africa
Films set in Cheshire
Films set in England
Films set in Liverpool
Films shot in Greater Manchester
Fox Searchlight Pictures films
Pathé films
Mormonism in fiction
Films with screenplays by Frank Cottrell-Boyce
2000s English-language films
2000s British films